DuBarry is a lost 1915 silent film historical drama based on David Belasco's 1901 play Du Barry. The play itself is adapted from the novel Memoirs d'un médicin by Alexandre Dumas. Mrs. Leslie Carter reprises her role from the Broadway play.

Cast
Mrs. Leslie Carter - Jeanette Vaubennier/Madame du Barry
Richard Thornton - Louis XV of France
Hamilton Revelle - De Cosse Brissac
Campbell Gullan - Comte. Jean Du Barry
Louis Payne - Papa Nuncio
Armand Pouget - Denys, Madame Dubarry's Servant
Miss Rawlinson - Hortense - The Head Milliner
Miss Corah Adams - Marquise De Creney
Miss Robinson - Marie Antoinette
Miss Wilkins - Sophia, A Maid)
Mr. Barker - Duc de Richelieu
Mrs. Cherney - Maupeau
Mrs. Eden - Madame La Gourdan

See also
Du Barry, Woman of Passion (1930)

References

External links
Dubarry at IMDb.com

1915 films
Lost American films
American films based on plays
Films based on French novels
Films based on multiple works
Films set in the 18th century
Films set in Paris
1915 drama films
Films based on adaptations
American silent feature films
Cultural depictions of Louis XV
Cultural depictions of Madame du Barry
Cultural depictions of Marie Antoinette
American black-and-white films
Silent American drama films
Films produced by George Kleine
1915 lost films
Lost drama films
1910s American films

it:La du Barry